Claude Sallier (4 April 1685, in Saulieu – 6 September 1761, in Paris) was a French ecclesiastic and philologist, as well as professor of Hebrew at the Collège royal and garde des manuscrits of the Bibliothèque du Roi.

Biography

Sallier and Europe

France's first public library 
Claude Sallier had an idea that was advanced for its era - to make culture accessible to all. From 1737 to 1750 he made books available to the town of Saulieu, forming France's first public library.

References

External links
Académie française

1685 births
1761 deaths
People from Saulieu
French philologists
French librarians
Fellows of the Royal Society
Translators from Hebrew
18th-century French translators